Jonathan Dele (20 October 1944 – 29 April 2017) was a Nigerian professional super feather/light/light welterweight boxer of the 1960s and 1970s who won Commonwealth lightweight title, his professional fighting weight varied from , i.e. super featherweight to , i.e. light welterweight. He also competed in the men's lightweight event at the 1968 Summer Olympics.

References

External links

1944 births
2017 deaths
Lightweight boxers
Light-welterweight boxers
Sportspeople from Lagos
Super-featherweight boxers
Nigerian male boxers
Olympic boxers of Nigeria
Boxers at the 1968 Summer Olympics